Erasmo Solórzano (born July 20, 1985, in Los Fresnos, Michoacán) is a Mexican former footballer.

References
 Erasmo Solorzano at the Major League Soccer website
 

1985 births
Living people
Chivas USA players
Footballers from Michoacán
Mexican footballers
University of California, Riverside alumni
LA Laguna FC players
Bakersfield Brigade players
USL League Two players
Major League Soccer players
UC Riverside Highlanders men's soccer players
Chivas USA draft picks
Association football midfielders